Football Club Bourgoin-Jallieu is a football club based in Bourgoin-Jallieu, France. It competes in the Championnat National 3, the fifth tier of the French football league system. The club's colours are sky blue and burgundy.

History 
The club was founded as Club Sportif Bergusien in 1936. In 1946, the club was renamed to Club Sportif Ouvrier. In 1957, FCBJ became affiliated to the French Football Federation.

In 1996, Bourgoin-Jallieu signed a partnership deal with Division 1 club Monaco. The same year, the club faced off against Martigues in the Coupe de France, who were then playing in the Division 2. In 1998, the club was promoted to the Division d'Honneur. In 2000, the club agreed to a partnership with first-tier Lens.

In 2004, after having achieved promotion the Championnat de France Amateur 2 (CFA 2) following a playoff match against Ajaccio B, the authorities decided to relegate Bourgoin-Jallieu back to the regional divisions. In 2010, the club signed a partnership with first-tier Lyon. In the 2012–13 season, FCBJ won the Coupe Rhône-Alpes and promotion to the CFA 2.

Players

Current squad

Notable former players 

 Jérémy Clément
 Ottman Dadoune
 Naïs Djouahra
 Amine Gouiri
 Malo Gusto
 Enzo Lombardo
 Florian Michel
 Elisha Owusu
 Bryan Mbeumo
 Kévin Monnet-Paquet
 Maxence Rivera
 Yoan Severin
 Roger Tamba M'Pinda
 Amos Youga

References 

Association football clubs established in 1936
1936 establishments in France
Sport in Isère
Football clubs in Auvergne-Rhône-Alpes